Yuen Sin Ying (born 13 January 1994) is a Hong Kong badminton player. She competed at the 2018 Asian Games in Jakarta, Indonesia. She won her first international title at the 2018 Hyderabad Open, a World Super 100 tournament, in the women's doubles event partnered with Ng Tsz Yau.

Achievements

BWF World Tour 
The BWF World Tour, which was announced on 19 March 2017 and implemented in 2018, is a series of elite badminton tournaments sanctioned by the Badminton World Federation (BWF). The BWF World Tour is divided into levels of World Tour Finals, Super 1000, Super 750, Super 500, Super 300 (part of the HSBC World Tour), and the BWF Tour Super 100.

Women's doubles

BWF International Challenge/Series 
Women's doubles

  BWF International Challenge tournament
  BWF International Series tournament

References

External links 
 

1994 births
Living people
Hong Kong female badminton players
Badminton players at the 2018 Asian Games
Asian Games competitors for Hong Kong